Josefa Köster (16 June 1918 – 17 April 2011) was a West German sprint canoeist who competed in the early 1950s. She finished eighth in the K-1 500 m event at the 1952 Summer Olympics in Helsinki.

References
Josefa Köster's profile at Sports Reference.com

1918 births
2011 deaths
Canoeists at the 1952 Summer Olympics
West German female canoeists
Olympic canoeists of West Germany
ICF Canoe Sprint World Championships medalists in kayak